Alphonso Carinci (November 9, 1862 – December 6, 1963) was a Roman Catholic Archbishop. He served as titular Archbishop of Selucia, in Isauria, from 1945 until his death at the age of 101.

Carinci was the oldest bishop at the first session of the Second Vatican Council (the 21st Ecumenical Council) held in Rome from October to December 1962.

Sources
 Catholic Hierarchy 

1862 births
1963 deaths
20th-century Italian Roman Catholic titular archbishops
Italian centenarians
Men centenarians